Hovarsin (also Romanized as Hovarsīn) is a village in Sumay-ye Jonubi Rural District of Sumay-ye Beradust District of Urmia County, West Azerbaijan province, Iran. At the 2006 National Census, its population was 1,147 in 178 households. The following census in 2011 counted 1,204 people in 225 households. The latest census in 2016 showed a population of 1,328 people in 276 households; it was the largest village in its rural district.

References 

Urmia County

Populated places in West Azerbaijan Province

Populated places in Urmia County